Dan Willis is an author of young adult and other fantasy novels in the Dragonlance series created by Margaret Weis and Tracy Hickman. He lives in Utah.

Biography
His Dragonlance fantasy novels were his first books published by a major publisher, and his first young adult works as well. All three of his Dragonlance: The New Adventures books are on the accelerated reading list for a junior high school in Utah.

Willis lives in Utah with his wife and four children. In addition to writing, Willis is a web designer and columnist, and a computer programmer.

Bibliography

Novels
Dragonlance: The New Adventures series
Written for readers age 10 and up.
 The Dragon Well (vol.3), September 1, 2004. The Dragon Well was Willis's first young adult novel.
 Dragon Knight (vol.7), May 3, 2005
 Wizard's Return (Trinistyr Trilogy vol.3), May 9, 2006

The Anvil of Time series
 The Survivors (vol.2), November 4, 2008

The Shattered West series
 The Flux Engine (vol.1), April 16, 2013

Arcane Casebook series
Dead Letter, a prequel to the series, was released in December 2018.
 In Plain Sight (December 2018)
 Ghost of a Chance (March 2019)
 The Long Chain (September 2019)
 Mind Games (February 2020)
 Limelight (May 2020)
 Blood Relations (October 2020)
 Capital Murder (April 2021)
 Hostile Takeover (forthcoming, April 2022)

Short works
"Lake of Death", pp. 127–152, collected in The Search for Power: Dragons from the War of Souls, edited by Margaret Weis, 2004-05-01

Sources:

Critical reception
Dragon Knight, the seventh volume in an eight-volume series, has been described as the best in the series. Both The Dragon Well and Dragon Knight have a 3.8 out of 5 rating on Goodreads.com. The Dragon Well was given a 2Q (out of 3Q) by Geri Diorio of the Voice of Youth Advocates, a professional journal for librarians.

References

External links

21st-century American male writers
21st-century American novelists
American fantasy writers
American male novelists
Living people
Novelists from Utah
Year of birth missing (living people)